Pilmoor railway station  was in North Yorkshire, England, from 1847 to 1958, at the junction of the Great North of England Railway and the Pilmoor, Boroughbridge and Knaresborough Railway, about  south-southeast of Thirsk at the southern edge of the civil parish of Sessay. The scattered settlement of Pilmoor (in the civil parish of Brafferton), from which its name was derived, is located southwest of it.

History 

The station opened on 20 September 1847 by the East and West Yorkshire Junction Railway as the junction station for its branch line to Boroughbridge with the main York to Darlington line. It was unusual in not having an access road when first constructed, due to it being purely an exchange station rather than one serving a local community. This connecting line was never opened but was used as a site for eyesight tests up until the 1960s.

The station was rebuilt during the Second World War in 1942, when the main line was widened to 4 tracks north towards Thirsk.  A new main building and station master's house was provided as part of this work.

The station was closed to both passengers and goods traffic on 5 May 1958, eight years after the branch line to Knaresborough closed to all traffic and five years after the Pickering route also lost its passenger trains.

References

External links 

Former North Eastern Railway (UK) stations
Railway stations in Great Britain opened in 1847
Railway stations in Great Britain closed in 1958
1847 establishments in England
1958 disestablishments in England
Disused railway stations in North Yorkshire